Fahimi is a surname. Notable persons with the surname include:

Babak Fahimi, American engineer
Muhammad Hussain Fahimi, Afghan politician
Nasser Fahimi (born 1974), political and ideological prisoner from Iran
Yasmin Fahimi (born 1967), German politician

Arabic-language surnames